The Table tennis competition in the 2001 Summer Universiade were held in Beijing, People's Republic of China.

Medal overview

Medal table

References 
 Sports123 (archived)
 World University Games Table Tennis on HickokSports.com (archived)

Universiade
2001 Summer Universiade
2001
Table tennis competitions in China